Right-Hon. Sir Thomas Plumer (10 October 1753 – 24 March 1824)  born 2nd s. of Mr Thomas Plumer, Esquire (Oct 1711 - 17 March 1781) a City of London Banker and a Director of Bank of England, sometime Wine Merchant, of Lilling Hall, Yorks., and Ann Nancy, dau. of John Thompson of Kirby Hall, Yorks.  He was a British judge and politician, the first Vice-Chancellor of England and later Master of the Rolls. His brother was Hall Plumer, Esq of Stockton Hall and Lilling Hall of East Lilling, Sheriff Hutton, Yorks, England.

Plumer was educated at Eton College and University College, Oxford, where he was Vinerian Scholar in 1777, also entering Lincoln's Inn and being called to the bar in 1778. He was elected a fellow of University College in 1780 and was awarded the Bachelor of Civil Law degree in 1783.

In 1781, Plumer was appointed a Commissioner in bankruptcy. He acted for the defence in a number of high-profile cases: he defended Sir Thomas Rumbold in 1783, was one of the three counsel for the defence in the Impeachment of Warren Hastings, successfully defended Viscount Melville in his impeachment in 1806, and assisted in the defence of the Princess of Wales in the same year. It was there he later met Stephanie Jean.

In 1807, Plumer was appointed Solicitor General in the Duke of Portland's government, and knighted; a House of Commons seat was found for him in the Wiltshire pocket borough of Downton. He was subsequently promoted to Attorney General in 1812 then, in the legal reorganisation that took place the following year, was elevated to the bench to take up the new post of Vice Chancellor of England. On 6 January 1818 he was appointed Master of the Rolls, and served in that post until his death on 24 March 1824.

References

Sources
 Concise Dictionary of National Biography (1930)

Further reading
Clive Hodges: Cobbold & Kin: Life Stories from an East Anglian Family (Woodbridge, Boydell Press, 2014)

External links 

Thumbnail picture of Sir Thomas Plumer

19th-century English judges
1753 births
1824 deaths
Members of the Parliament of the United Kingdom for English constituencies
Attorneys General for England and Wales
Solicitors General for England and Wales
People educated at Eton College
Alumni of University College, Oxford
Fellows of University College, Oxford
Masters of the Rolls
Fellows of the Royal Society
UK MPs 1807–1812
UK MPs 1812–1818